Kelston is a residential suburb of West Auckland, New Zealand. Originally a ceramics manufacturing centre, the area is now mostly residential, including a number of schools. Kelston is located in, and its name has been given to, the Kelston parliamentary electorate.

History

The Western shores of the Whau River in Kelston was home to an Archibald Brothers clay and pottery yard in the late 19th century.

Demographics

Kelston had a population of 5,355 at the 2018 New Zealand census, an increase of 453 people (9.2%) since the 2013 census, and an increase of 687 people (14.7%) since the 2006 census. There were 1,452 households, comprising 2,685 males and 2,670 females, giving a sex ratio of 1.01 males per female, with 1,179 people (22.0%) aged under 15 years, 1,368 (25.5%) aged 15 to 29, 2,364 (44.1%) aged 30 to 64, and 444 (8.3%) aged 65 or older.

Ethnicities were 29.6% European/Pākehā, 16.0% Māori, 35.9% Pacific peoples, 34.1% Asian, and 3.5% other ethnicities. People may identify with more than one ethnicity.

The percentage of people born overseas was 44.6, compared with 27.1% nationally.

Although some people chose not to answer the census's question about religious affiliation, 27.3% had no religion, 47.1% were Christian, 1.0% had Māori religious beliefs, 9.8% were Hindu, 5.2% were Muslim, 2.8% were Buddhist and 1.7% had other religions.

Of those at least 15 years old, 810 (19.4%) people had a bachelor's or higher degree, and 723 (17.3%) people had no formal qualifications. 381 people (9.1%) earned over $70,000 compared to 17.2% nationally. The employment status of those at least 15 was that 2,064 (49.4%) people were employed full-time, 513 (12.3%) were part-time, and 225 (5.4%) were unemployed.

Education

The first school to open in the area was the New Lynn School, which opened on the modern site of Kelston Girls' College in 1888, moving from the site in 1914. In 1953, Kelston Primary School opened, and in 1954 a coeducational school, Kelston High School, opened at the old site of the New Lynn School, as the third high school to open in West Auckland after Avondale College (1945) and Henderson High School (1953). Kelston High School was separated into two schools in 1963, with Kelston Girls' High School remaining at the site and Kelston Boys' High School moving to a new campus to the north. In 2004, the school was renamed Kelston Girls' College. 

Kelston Boys' High School is a single-sex state secondary (years 9-15) school with a roll of  students. It is renowned for its rugby union team, the Kelston Boys High 1st XV. The school has produced a number of All Blacks, and regularly wins Auckland, nationwide and even worldwide secondary school rugby championships.

In 1958 the Kelston Deaf Education Centre was opened as a centre of learning for hearing-impaired children from the northern half of the North Island, from preschool to year 15. It has boarding facilities. Some senior classes are held in conjunction with Kelston Boys High School. It is currently a campus of Ko Taku Reo: Deaf Education New Zealand, the combined body for deaf education in New Zealand. The Kelston campus is coeducational state special school with a roll of  students.

Kelston Intermediate is a coeducational state intermediate (years 7-8) school with a roll of  students. It opened in 1958.

Rolls are as of

References

External links
 Photographs of Kelston held in Auckland Libraries' heritage collections.

Suburbs of Auckland
Whau Local Board Area
Populated places around the Waitematā Harbour
West Auckland, New Zealand